Thomas Foley (c. 1641 – 1 February 1701) was the eldest son of the ironmaster Thomas Foley. He succeeded his father to the Great Witley estate, including Witley Court, in 1677.

He was educated at Pembroke College, Cambridge, being admitted in 1657 aged 16, graduating B.A. 1660, and was admitted to the Inner Temple in 1657.

He was appointed High Sheriff of Worcestershire for 1673–74. He served as a member of Parliament for Worcestershire from 1679 to 1685; again from 1689 to 1698 and then in 1699 and 1701 for Droitwich. He was an active member.

Like several members of his family, he was concerned in the iron industry, but only at Tintern.

He married Elizabeth Ashe, daughter of Edward Ashe of Heytesbury, Wiltshire; they had four sons and four daughters:

 Thomas Foley (1673–1733), who was created Baron Foley of Kidderminster in 1712.
 Edward Foley (1676–1747), twice MP for Droitwich
 Richard Foley (1681–1732), MP for Droitwich in 1711–1732
 John Foley (drowned 1710)
 Elizabeth Foley, sixth great-grandmother to Queen Elizabeth II, who married Robert Harley, later Lord Treasurer and Earl of Oxford
 Anne Foley who married Salwey Winnington
 Sarah Foley who married Robert Harley's brother, Edward Harley MP.
 Mary Foley who married Sir Blundel Charlton

References

M. B. Rowlands, 'Foley family (per. c.1620–1716)', Oxford Dictionary of National Biography, Oxford University Press, Sept 2004; online edn, Jan 2008 accessed 2 March 2008
Burke's Peerage

1640s births
1701 deaths
Alumni of Pembroke College, Cambridge
Members of the Inner Temple
British ironmasters
High Sheriffs of Worcestershire
Thomas
English MPs 1679
English MPs 1680–1681
English MPs 1681
English MPs 1689–1690
English MPs 1690–1695
English MPs 1695–1698
English MPs 1701
Members of the Parliament of England for Droitwich
Members of the Parliament of England for Worcestershire